William Appleton may refer to:

 William Appleton (politician) (1786–1862), congressman from Massachusetts
 Will Appleton (1889–1958), mayor of Wellington, New Zealand
 W. A. Appleton (William Archibald Appleton, 1859–1940), British trade union leader
 William Sumner Appleton (1874–1947), founder of the Society for the Preservation of New England Antiquities
 William M. Appleton (1920–2001), Pennsylvania politician
 William Henry Appleton (1814–1899), American publisher
 William Appleton (entrepreneur) (born 1961), American entrepreneur and technologist
 William H. Appleton (1843–1912), American soldier and Medal of Honor recipient
 William Thomas Appleton (1859–1930), Australian businessman, shipping agent and public servant